A list of films produced in Hong Kong in 1970.

1970

References

External links
 IMDB list of Hong Kong films
 Hong Kong films of 1970 at HKcinemamagic.com

1970
Lists of 1970 films by country or language
1970 in Hong Kong